Neil Van der Ploeg (born 23 September 1987) is an Australian cyclist, who most recently rode for Australian amateur team Albury Wodonga Panthers Cycling Club.

Major results

2013
 4th Road race, Oceania Road Championships
 4th Road race, National Road Championships
2014
 3rd Overall Tour of China I
 5th Overall Herald Sun Tour
 8th Road race, Oceania Road Championships
2015
 Tour de Kumano
1st Points classification
1st Prologue & Stage 1
 3rd Road race, National Road Championships
 4th Overall Tour of China I
1st Stage 2 (ITT)
 7th Overall Tour de Korea
 9th Road race, Oceania Road Championships
2017
 4th Midden–Brabant Poort Omloop
 8th Road race, Oceania Road Championships

References

External links

1987 births
Living people
Australian male cyclists